Shiva Kumar Mandal is a Nepalese Politician, Minister of Supplies and serving as the Member Of House Of Representatives (Nepal) elected from Morang-5, Province No. 1. He is member of the Nepal Communist Party.

References

Living people
Place of birth missing (living people)
21st-century Nepalese politicians
People from Morang District
Nepal Communist Party (NCP) politicians
Communist Party of Nepal (Maoist Centre) politicians
Nepal MPs 2017–2022
Members of the 2nd Nepalese Constituent Assembly
1975 births